Off the Grid is the debut studio album by Swedish pop boy band The Fooo. It was released in Sweden through The Artist House on 2 April 2014. The album peaked at number one on the Swedish Albums Chart.

Singles
"Build a Girl" was released as the lead single from the album on 16 August 2013. The song peaked at number 41 on the Swedish Singles Chart. "King of the Radio" was released as the second single from the album on 21 February 2014.

Track listing

Charts

Weekly charts

Year-end charts

Release history

References

2014 debut albums
FO&O albums